Sharifiyeh (also Romanized as Sharīfīyeh; also known as Hasbeh-i-Kochek, Sharafī, and Sharfiyeh) is a village in Mosharrahat Rural District, in the Central District of Ahvaz County, Khuzestan Province, Iran. At the 2006 census, its population was 106, in 15 families.

References 

Populated places in Ahvaz County